American Southern Bank was a financial company founded in 2005 and engaged primarily in retail banking, mortgage banking, business finance and providing ATM and merchant processing services. The bank had a full service banking office serving Roswell, Georgia.

On April 24, 2009, Georgia Department of Banking and Finance shut down American Southern Bank, marking the 26th bank failure of 2009 in the United States, and the 51st since the beginning of the recession, as the credit crunch continued to spread through the economy. Bank of North Georgia of Alpharetta, Georgia, assumed all of the deposits. As of March 30, 2009, American Southern Bank had assets of about $112.3 million and total deposits of $104.3 million.

References

External links

FDIC Bank Closing Information for American Southern Bank

Kennesaw, Georgia
Bank failures in the United States
Banks established in 2005
Banks disestablished in 2009
Banks based in Georgia (U.S. state)
Defunct companies based in Georgia (U.S. state)
Defunct banks of the United States
2005 establishments in Georgia (U.S. state)
2009 disestablishments in Georgia (U.S. state)